Princess Jieyou is a 2016 Chinese historical television series, based on the story of Princess Jieyou of the Han dynasty. It is directed by Lu Yang, written by Xu Yiliang, Yu Yang, Sun Hao and Xue Qiao, and stars Zhang Xinyi, Yuan Hong, Yuan Wenkang, Zhang Yiluan, and Ye Qing. The series aired on CCTV-8 from 18 February to 28 February 2016.

Synopsis
In the period of Emperor Wu of Han (141 BC-87 BC), the Han Empire is being invaded by the Xiongnu empire. In order to defeat the Xiongnu, Emperor Wu dispatches Princess Jieyou to the Wusun kingdom to marry the King Weng Kunmi, then the two empires form an alliance against the Xiongnu.

Cast

Main
 Zhang Xinyi as Liu Jieyou or Princess Jieyou, a princess sent to marry the leader of the Wusun kingdom as part of the Western Han (206 BC-9 AD) Chinese policy of heqin.
 Yuan Hong as Weng Gui, a royal in the Wusun kingdom, brother of King Kunmi, after the death of Kunmi, he secures the position of King.
 Yuan Wenkang as Kunmi, King of Wusun kingdom.
 Zhang Yiluan as Hu Gu, the first beauty of the Huns, Jun Xumi's wife.
 Ye Qing as Feng Liao, a businesswoman of the Western Han dynasty, she loves Huai Tiansha.

Supporting
 Liu Guanxiang as Huai Tiansha, the envoy of the Western Han Dynasty. He dies in the war between the Han and the Xiongnu.
 Yang Yi as A Cai, an actress in the theatrical troupe. She is burned to death due to save the Princess Liu Jieyou.
 Qu Shuangshuang as Yun Gute, Jun Xumi's wife.
 Wu Qiang as Changshan Yihou, a Xiongnu people and marquis in the Wusun kingdom.
 Wang Zixuan as Princess Jingjun, Liu Jieyou's younger female cousin.
 Lu Qiwei as A Yi'na, Changshan Xihou's younger sister. She loves Weng Gui.
 Yu Bo as Emperor Wu of Han, the seventh emperor of the Han dynasty.

Production
The producers hired Lu Yang (Brotherhood of Blades), a Golden Rooster Award winner, to serve as its director.

On August 5, 2014, the producers held a press conference in Beijing, the producers released a trailer and the official posters.

Production started on August 5, 2014 and ended on October 31, 2014. Most of the TV series was made on locations in Beijing, Zhejiang, Anhui, and Inner Mongolia.

Soundtrack

Ratings 

 Highest ratings are marked in red, lowest ratings are marked in blue

International broadcast

References

External links
 
 

Television series about China
Television series set in the Western Han dynasty
Chinese historical television series
2016 Chinese television series debuts